Hashan Gunathilleke (born 17 April 1986) is a Sri Lankan cricketer. He made his List A debut for Seeduwa Raddoluwa Cricket Club in the 2009–10 Premier Limited Overs Tournament on 2 September 2009. He made his first-class debut for Seeduwa Raddoluwa Cricket Club in Tier B of the 2006–07 Premier Trophy on 2 October 2009. He made his Twenty20 debut for Sri Lanka Ports Authority Cricket Club in the 2012 CSN Premier Clubs T20 Tournament on 27 March 2012.

References

External links
 

1986 births
Living people
Sri Lankan cricketers
Monaragala District cricketers
Nondescripts Cricket Club cricketers
Seeduwa Raddoluwa Cricket Club cricketers
Sri Lanka Ports Authority Cricket Club cricketers
Cricketers from Colombo